The Asian Journal of Pharmaceutics is a peer-reviewed open-access medical journal published by Medknow Publications on behalf of the B.R. Nahata Smriti Sansthan (Memorial Trust) (Mandsaur, India). Articles address topics in pharmaceutics, biopharmaceutics, pharmaceutical chemistry, pharmacognosy, pharmacology, pharmaceutical analysis, pharmacy practice, and clinical and hospital pharmacy.

Abstracting and indexing 
The journal is abstracted and indexed in the following databases:

According to the Journal Citation Reports, the journal has a 2012 impact factor of 0.460.

References

External links 
 

Open access journals
Quarterly journals
English-language journals
Medknow Publications academic journals
Pharmacology journals
Publications established in 2007